Lăzăreanu is a Romanian surname. Notable people with the surname include:

Barbu Lăzăreanu
Filip Lăzăreanu, Romanian footballer
Irina Lăzăreanu, Romanian-Canadian model and folk singer
Marcel Lăzăreanu, Romanian footballer
Gheorghe A. Lăzăreanu-Lăzurică

Romanian-language surnames